Robert Rose (born December 24, 1987) is a former American football defensive end. He was signed by the Seattle Seahawks as an undrafted free agent in 2010. He played college football at Ohio State.

Professional career

Seattle Seahawks
Rose was acquired by the Seattle Seahawks as an undrafted free agent on April 24, 2010, and played the 2010 preseason with them. He was waived during final cuts on September 4.

Miami Dolphins
The Miami Dolphins claimed Rose off waivers on September 5, 2010 and placed him on the teams inactive roster for the season opener against the Dallas Cowboys.  Rose was waived by the Dolphins on September 18, in order to promote veteran defensive lineman Ryan Baker from the practice squad to the active roster. Rose was re-signed to the team's practice squad on September 21, and was promoted to the active roster on September 29. He was waived on October 27 and re-signed to the team's practice squad on October 28. Rose was released prior to the 2011 NFL season on September 3, 2011.

Hamilton Tiger-Cats
Rose signed with the Hamilton Tiger-Cats on October 18, 2011.

Cleveland Gladiators
Rose was assigned to the Cleveland Gladiators of the Arena Football League on October 4, 2013.

Las Vegas Outlaws
Rose was selected by the Las Vegas Outlaws in the 2014 Expansion Draft on December 22, 2014.

Cleveland Gladiators
In March 2016, Rose was assigned to the Cleveland Gladiators. On May 5, 2016, Rose was placed on reassignment.

References

External links
Hamilton Tiger-Cats bio

1987 births
Living people
American football defensive ends
Ohio State Buckeyes football players
Seattle Seahawks players
Miami Dolphins players
Hamilton Tiger-Cats players
Dallas Cowboys players
Cleveland Gladiators players
Las Vegas Outlaws (arena football) players
Players of American football from Cleveland